Bonifacius Cornelis de Jonge (22 January 1875 – 24 June 1958) was a Dutch politician and aristocrat who served as governor-general of the Dutch East Indies from 1931 to 1936. A member of the Christian Historical Union (CHU), he previously served as Minister of War from 1917 to 1918.

Early life 

Bonifacius Cornelis de Jonge was born on 22 January 1875, in The Hague, Netherlands. He was the son of Mr. Bonifacius Cornelis de Jonge (1834–1907), president of the District Court of The Hague and then a judge in the Supreme Court of the Netherlands, and Elisabeth Henrietta Maria Philipse (1839–1927). On 5 July 1904, de Jonge married Anna Cornelia Baroness of Wassenaer (1883–1959), founder and chairman of the General Support Fund for Indigenous Persons. Together, had four children.

Political career

Early career 

De Jonge began his career as a civil servant. In 1917, he joined the Christian Historical Union (CHU) and was appointed Minister of War in the Cort van der Linden cabinet. Responsible for maintaining Dutch neutrality in World War I, de Jonge was further appointed interim Minister of the Navy on 28 June 1918. He remained Minister in both portfolios until the fall of the government at the 1918 general election.

Following the end of the war, de Jonge briefly serve as an attaché to the viceroy of the Dutch colony of Surinam. He was later appointed by the government of Hendrikus Colijn to serve on the board of the Bataafse Petroleum Maatschappij. He also refused appointments as Minister for War, Minister of War and Navy (1922), Queen's Commissioner in Utrecht (1924), and mayor of Rotterdam (1928).

Governor-general 

In 1931, de Jonge became governor-general of the Dutch East Indies. As governor-general, he was opposed to any form of Indonesian nationalism and unwilling to see the Volksraad, the semi-legislative body of the colony, play any significant role. Under his rule, the repressiveness of the colonial government increased, with political meetings being frequently broken up by the police and speakers arrested. Organized nationalist opposition ultimately resulted in de Jonge suspending the ordinance in 1933.

He left the position on 16 September 1936. He was replaced by Alidius Tjarda van Starkenborgh Stachouwer. He died on 24 June 1958, in Zeist, Netherlands.

Footnotes

References

Citations

Sources

Further reading

External links 

 

1875 births
1958 deaths
Dutch nobility
Jonkheers of the Netherlands
Ministers of War of the Netherlands
Ministers of the Navy of the Netherlands
Governors-General of the Dutch East Indies
Grand Officers of the Order of Orange-Nassau
Commanders of the Order of the Netherlands Lion
Politicians from The Hague
20th-century Dutch East Indies people